Leigh David Franks (born 7 March 1991) is an English footballer who plays as a defender for Scarborough Athletic in the Northern Premier League Division One North.

Career 
Franks was signed up from Bridlington Town in 2007. In the 2009–10 season, he was sent on loan to Conference North side Fleetwood Town.

In the 2010–11 season, Huddersfield manager Lee Clark sent Franks out on loan to League Two side Oxford United for six months. He returned to the Galpharm on 5 January 2011. At the end of the season he was released by Huddersfield and in June 2011 he joined Alfreton Town. Despite an injury hit first season, Franks signed a new one-year contract with the club on 23 May 2012.

On 18 June 2013, Franks rejected a new contract offer from Alfreton and joined Harrogate Town. As he was under 24 and offered fresh terms, Alfreton received an undisclosed fee for the player.

References

External links 
Leigh Franks profile at Alfreton Town F.C.

 

1991 births
Living people
Sportspeople from Scarborough, North Yorkshire
English footballers
Association football defenders
Huddersfield Town A.F.C. players
Fleetwood Town F.C. players
Oxford United F.C. players
Alfreton Town F.C. players
Harrogate Town A.F.C. players
English Football League players
National League (English football) players
Footballers from North Yorkshire
Scarborough Athletic F.C. players